Gopi Krishna is an Indian film editor, who has worked on Tamil language films. He made a breakthrough after his work in Mohan Raja's Thani Oruvan (2015) was well recognised.

Career
Gopi Krishna formally learnt the art of editing by undertaking a qualification at MGR Government Film and Television Institute, Chennai. Gopi Krishna's first successful project was Balaji Sakthivel's mystery film Vazhakku Enn 18/9 (2012), following which he received more opportunities to edit Tamil films. He had a career breakthrough after his work in Mohan Raja's Thani Oruvan (2015) was well recognised, and this subsequently led to him receiving bigger film offers from producers. He then also went on to work in the successful horror comedy film Dhilluku Dhuddu (2016).

In 2017, Gopi Krishna has agreed to edit several mid-budget Tamil films including the horror film Dora, the comedy Mannar Vagaiyara and the period drama 1945.

Filmography

As editor

References

Living people
1985 births
Tamil film editors
Film editors from Tamil Nadu
Telugu film editors